Romiley railway station serves Romiley, in the Metropolitan Borough of Stockport, Greater Manchester, England.

History
It was built by the Manchester, Sheffield and Lincolnshire Railway on its extension to New Mills, opening in 1862 from Manchester London Road.

Facilities
The station was built above street level; its platforms extend over the B6104 road. It has a spiral staircase, which once had a glass-roofed dome. The booking hall (staffed 06:20-20:45 weekdays and 07:10-21:35 Saturdays) and offices are on the first floor, with a subway and stairs to the platforms. Ramps are also available for wheelchair users.

The station has a long line public address system providing automated announcements and digital information displays to offer train running details (these can also be obtained by phone or from timetable posters).

From the south, trains arrive both from Marple, on the Sheffield line, and Rose Hill Marple. The MB&MR closed south of Rose Hill to Macclesfield in January 1970; this line had been listed for closure in the 1963 Beeching Report. The short branch to Rose Hill itself was reprieved by the then Minister of Transport Richard Marsh in 1969, when granting permission to close the rest of the route.

To the north, the line splits in three ways. Initially it just ran through to Woodley to join the original MS&L line at Hyde Junction. In 1875, a more direct route to Manchester was opened through Reddish. A further branch, opened in 1869, led to Stockport Tiviot Dale; at one time, this carried through trains from Derby to Manchester Central but this route was closed to passenger services in January 1967 and much of the line was lifted in 1983.

Service 
On Mondays to Fridays, four trains per hour go northbound to Manchester Piccadilly (two via Guide Bridge and two via ) and two per hour go towards Marple (one to New Mills Central and the other through to Sheffield) and two per hour to Rose Hill Marple southbound.

On Saturdays, there is a similar level of service to Manchester and Marple / Rose Hill Marple, but an hourly service to New Mills and Sheffield.

On Sundays, there is an hourly service each way to Manchester Piccadilly and to Sheffield.

Future

As part of Manchester's Transport Innovation Fund (TIF) bid, which would have seen a weekday peak time congestion charge introduced on roads into the city centre in order for a £3bn injection into the region's public transport, it had been announced that Marple railway station would have seen an increase to four services per hour in both directions throughout the day to Manchester Piccadilly.

This would therefore have meant an increase to five services per hour at Romiley, with possibility for more, should services from Rose Hill have been increased as discussed. The line would have effectively been run as a "turn up and go" operation, offering users of stations along the route the ease of showing up without generally needing to know exact departure times.

Romiley railway station was also planned to become an official "TIF Park & Ride" interchange under the proposals, which faced a public referendum in December 2008.  These were rejected by a substantial margin  and the plans were eventually dropped in the spring of 2010.

Notes

References 

 Marshall, J. (1981) Forgotten Railways North-West England, David & Charles (Publishers) Ltd, Newton Abbott. 
 Radford, B., (1988) Midland Though The Peak Unicorn Books

External links 

Railway stations in the Metropolitan Borough of Stockport
DfT Category E stations
Former Great Central and Midland Joint Railway stations
Railway stations in Great Britain opened in 1862
Northern franchise railway stations
1862 establishments in England